Raphael Jacob Manasseh (1762 – 21 April 1832) was an Ottoman rabbinical writer and chief rabbi of Salonica. Among his works are Ohel Ya'aḳob (Salonica, 1832), an alphabetical collection of the laws of religion; Be'er ha-Mayim (Salonica, 1836), responsa; and En ha-Mayim (printed in 1858), a commentary on the Shulchan Aruch and Yoreh De'ah.

Publications

References
 

1762 births
1832 deaths
18th-century rabbis from the Ottoman Empire
19th-century rabbis from the Ottoman Empire
Rabbis from Thessaloniki
Writers from Thessaloniki